The 350 nanometer process (350 nm process) is a level of semiconductor process technology that was reached in the 1995–1996 timeframe by leading semiconductor companies like Intel and IBM.

Products featuring 350 nm manufacturing process
 MTI VR4300i (1995), used in the Nintendo 64 game console.
 Intel Pentium (P54CS, 1995), Pentium Pro (1995) and initial Pentium II CPUs (Klamath, 1997).
 AMD K5 (1996) and original AMD K6 (Model 6, 1997) CPUs.
 МЦСТ-R150 (2001).
 Parallax Propeller (2006), 8 core microcontroller.

References

00350
1995 introductions